Pisgah is a city in Harrison County, Iowa, United States, along the Soldier River. The community is located in the midst of the Loess Hills.
The population was 249 at the time of the 2020 census.

History
Pisgah was laid out in 1899. The town's name is a biblical one chosen by members of the Church of Jesus Christ of Latter-day Saints (Mormons), who established a temporary settlement in central Iowa near a hill they christened Mount Pisgah. A post office called Pisgah has been in operation since 1902.

Geography
Pisgah is located at  (41.832684, -95.926464).

Demographics

2010 census
At the 2010 census there were 251 people, 121 households, and 66 families living in the city. The racial makeup of the city was 97.6% White, 0.8% Native American, and 1.6% from two or more races. Hispanic or Latino people of any race were 3.2%.

Of the 121 households 21.5% had children under the age of 18 living with them, 37.2% were married couples living together, 14.0% had a female householder with no husband present, 3.3% had a male householder with no wife present, and 45.5% were non-families. 43.8% of households were one person and 24% were one person aged 65 or older. The average household size was 2.07 and the average family size was 2.83.

The median age was 48.2 years. 23.1% of residents were under the age of 18; 5.3% were between the ages of 18 and 24; 16.8% were from 25 to 44; 30% were from 45 to 64; and 25.1% were 65 or older. The gender makeup of the city was 46.2% male and 53.8% female.

2000 census
At the 2000 census there were 316 people, 143 households, and 84 families living in the city. The racial makeup of the city was 99.05% White, 0.32% Native American, 0.32% Asian, and 0.32% from two or more races. Hispanic or Latino people of any race were 0.63%.

Of the 143 households 24.5% had children under the age of 18 living with them, 51.0% were married couples living together, 7.0% had a female householder with no husband present, and 40.6% were non-families. 36.4% of households were one person and 25.2% were one person aged 65 or older. The average household size was 2.21 and the average family size was 2.89.

26.6% of the people are under the age of 18, 1.9% from 18 to 24, 21.2% from 25 to 44, 21.2% from 45 to 64, and 29.1% 65 or older. The median age was 45 years. For every 100 females, there were 83.7 males. For every 100 females age 18 and over, there were 88.6 males.

The median household income was $26,125 and the median family income  was $37,292. Males had a median income of $27,250 versus $17,500 for females. The per capita income for the city was $13,837. About 10.8% of families and 15.5% of the population were below the poverty line, including 16.4% of those under age 18 and 18.0% of those age 65 or over.

Education
It is within the West Harrison Community School District.

Notable people

 James Allen, Mormon Battalion organizer
 Loren Babe, Major League Baseball third baseman

References

Cities in Harrison County, Iowa
Cities in Iowa